Ancistrocarya is a genus of flowering plants belonging to the family Boraginaceae.

Its native range is Japan.

Species:

Ancistrocarya japonica

References

Boraginaceae
Boraginaceae genera